A bee line is an idiom for the shortest route or a straight line between two points (see "as the crow flies"): bee line, bee-line, or beeline may also refer to:

Brands and enterprises
 Beeline (brand), a telecommunications brand by VimpelCom Ltd. used in Russia, other post-Soviet states, Laos, Cambodia and Vietnam
 Beeline (software company) for companies to manage temporary staff
 Beeline reader for adding colors to text to speed reading transitions from one line to the next

Transportation
 Bee Line Buzz Company, a former bus operator in Greater Manchester, United Kingdom
 Bee Line Expressway, an earlier name of Florida State Road 528 east of Orlando in the United States
 Bee Line Railroad, a railway in western Indiana, United States; serving Warren County and Benton County
 BEE-LINE, Brussels Airlines callsign
 Bee-Line Bus System of Westchester County, New York, United States
 Beeline, or Okmulgee Beeline, the section of U.S. Route 75 from Tulsa to Okmulgee, Oklahoma, United States
 Beeline Highway (disambiguation), several highways
 First Berkshire & The Thames Valley, formerly known as Beeline.

Other uses
 Beeline (album), a 2002 album by Peter Case
 Beeline (beekeeping), a method for locating a feral bee hive
 Vermilion snapper, a species of fish

See also 
 B Line (disambiguation)

cs:B (linka)
nl:Lijn B